TV-resistori is an Indie rock band from Turku, Finland.

Discography
Tv-Resistori (2011)
Petit Pianista, 7" (2001)
Melodi Melodika, cassette (2003)
Melodi Melodika, 7"(2003)
Intiaanidisko (2004)
TV-resistori/Islaja Split, 7" (2006)
Serkut rakastaa paremmin (2006)

External links
Official TV-resistori site
Official MySpace page
Fonal Records

Finnish rock music groups
Musical groups from Turku